Comarca Mancha del Júcar is a comarca of the Province of Albacete, Spain.

Comarcas of the Province of Albacete

es:Comarca Mancha del Júcar